In music, 22 equal temperament, called 22-TET, 22-EDO, or 22-ET, is the tempered scale derived by dividing the octave into 22 equal steps (equal frequency ratios).

When composing with 22-ET, one needs to take into account a variety of considerations. Considering the 5-limit, there is a difference between 3 fifths and the sum of 1 fourth + 1 major third. It means that, starting from C, there are two A's - one 16 steps and one 17 steps away. There is also a difference between a major tone and a minor tone. In C major, the second note (D) will be 4 steps away. However, in A minor, where A is 6 steps below C, the fourth note (D) will be 9 steps above A, so 3 steps above C. So when switching from C major to A minor, one need to slightly change the note D. These discrepancies arise because, unlike 12-ET, 22-ET does not temper out the syntonic comma of 81/80, and in fact exaggerates its size by mapping it to one step.

Extending 22-ET to the 7-limit, we find the septimal minor seventh (7/4) can be distinguished from the sum of a fifth (3/2) and a minor third (6/5). Also the septimal subminor third (7/6) is different from the minor third (6/5). This mapping tempers out the septimal comma of 64/63, which allows 22-ET to function as a "Superpythagorean" system where four stacked fifths are equated with the septimal major third (9/7) rather than the usual pental third of 5/4. This system is a "mirror image" of septimal meantone in many ways. Instead of tempering the fifth narrow so that intervals of 5 are simple while intervals of 7 are complex, the fifth is tempered wide so that intervals of 7 are simple while intervals of 5 are complex. The enharmonic structure is also reversed: sharps are sharper than flats, similar to Pythagorean tuning, but to a greater degree.

Finally, 22-ET has a good approximation of the 11th harmonic, and is in fact the smallest equal temperament to be consistent in the 11-limit.

The net effect is that 22-ET allows (and to some extent even forces) the exploration of new musical territory, while still having excellent approximations of common practice consonances.

History and use

The idea of dividing the octave into 22 steps of equal size seems to have originated with nineteenth-century music theorist RHM Bosanquet. Inspired by the division of the octave into 22 unequal parts in the music theory of India, Bosanquet noted that an equal division was capable of representing 5-limit music with tolerable accuracy. In this he was followed in the twentieth century by theorist José Würschmidt, who noted it as a possible next step after 19 equal temperament, and J. Murray Barbour in his survey of tuning history, Tuning and Temperament. Contemporary advocates of 22 equal temperament include music theorist Paul Erlich.

Notation

22-EDO can be notated several ways. The first, Up/Down Notation, uses ups and downs in addition to sharps and flats, chord spellings may change(C, E, G is C major triad). This yields the following chromatic scale:

C, C, C, C,

D, E, E, E, E,

F, F, F, F,

G, G/A, G/A, G/A,

A, B, B, B, B, C

The second, Quarter Tone Notation, uses quarter tone notation to divide the notes of Up/Down Notation. However, some chord spellings may change(C, E, G is C major triad). This yields the following chromatic scale:

C, C, C/D, D,

D, D, D/E, E, E,

F, F, F/G, G,

G, G, G/A, A,

A, A, A/B, B, B, C

The third, Porcupine Notation, introduces no new accidentals, but significantly changes chord spellings(C, E, G is C major triad). In addition, enharmonicities from 12-EDO are no longer valid. This yields the following chromatic scale:

C, C, D,
D, D, E,
E, E, F,
F, F, G,
G, G, G/A, A,
A, A, B,
B, B, C, C

Interval size
The table below gives the sizes of some common intervals in 22 equal temperament.  An interval shown with a shaded background — such as the septimal tritone — is one that is more than 1/4 of a step (approximately 13.6 cents) out of tune, when compared to the just ratio it approximates.

See also
Musical temperament
Equal temperament

References

External links 
Erlich, Paul, "Tuning, Tonality, and Twenty-Two Tone Temperament", William A. Sethares.
Pachelbel's Canon in 22edo (MIDI), Herman Miller

Equal temperaments
Microtonality